Alexander Andreevich Belskiy was a Soviet specialist in literary criticism, Anglicist (he did researches in realism development in the English literature). Alexander Belskiy founded Perm school of research in non-Russian Philology. Also, he founded the Faculty of Philology at Perm State University and he was its first Dean in 1960–1964 and 1971–1977. Moreover, he founded the Department of Foreign literature at Perm State University, and he was its Head in 1965–1977. His famous student is Boris Proskurnin, the Dean of Faculty of Foreign languages and Literature at Perm State University.

Sources
 Alexander Belskiy at Russian Wikipedia: Бельский, Александр Андреевич // Википедия, свободная энциклопедия.

References

1921 births
1977 deaths
People from Oryol
Russian philologists
Oles Honchar Dnipro National University alumni
Academic staff of Perm State University
Soviet literary historians
Soviet male writers
20th-century male writers
20th-century philologists